James Omondi Oduor (born December 30, 1980 in Nairobi) is a former Kenyan football defender who last played for Mathare United, and currently manages Karuturi Sports in the Kenyan National Super League.

Club career
Omondi began his career by Sher Agencies before left the team in 2003, to Thika United. After two years left 2005 Thika and move to Vietnamese club P. Sông Lam Nghệ An, in Vietnam played 1 year before moving to Ethiopian Premier League team Saint-George SA. After 9 months he left the Ethiopian Premier League to move back to Thika United, where he played again for 6 months before moving to the Seychelles League with Anse Réunion. He left the Seychellois club in 2009 for Mathare United, where he ended his playing career.

International career
He presented his country Kenya on international level from 2002 to 2004. He was also part of the team that took part in the 2004 Africa Cup of Nations.

Managerial career
Coach Mahakama F.C
Omondi had been the assistant coach of Thika United, where he played during his club career, but later became the assistant coach of Kenya Commercial Bank before being promoted to head coach after Leonard Swaleh was sacked with immediate effect. He was sacked by KCB on 28 November 2012, however, after his side finished tenth in the 2012 Kenyan Premier League season, and replaced by Abdallah Juma on 19 December.

On 3 April 2013, after the departure of Michael Nam to FKF Division One side FC Talanta on 14 March, Omondi took over as head coach of Karuturi Sports.

On September 5th 2019, he got his appointment as the Ushuru Football Club head coach after serving as the deputy head coach for a year and a half.

References

External links
 

1981 births
Living people
Footballers from Nairobi
Kenyan footballers
Kenyan expatriate footballers
Kenya international footballers
Association football midfielders
Expatriate footballers in Vietnam
Association football utility players
Anse Réunion FC players
Expatriate footballers in Ethiopia
Thika United F.C. players
Expatriate footballers in Seychelles
Mathare United F.C. players
2004 African Cup of Nations players
Vegpro F.C. players